Baron  was a general in the early Imperial Japanese Army.

Biography
Uchiyama was born in Edo as the second son to a samurai family in the service of Tottori Domain. He entered the Imperial Japanese Army Academy in May 1877. He was commissioned as a second lieutenant in the artillery of the fledgling Imperial Japanese Army in December 1879. In 1886, he graduated from the Army Staff College and was promoted to captain. In 1888, he became commandant of the Imperial Japanese Army Academy and in 1890 served on the staff of the IJA 6th Division. In September 1893 he was promoted to major, and the following year was assigned to the staff of the IJA 1st Division.

During the First Sino-Japanese War  he was with the IJA 1st Division, and was promoted to lieutenant colonel of artillery in 1894. He became chief-of-staff of the IJA 1st Division in February 1895; however, he returned to Japan in May and was sent as a military attaché to Russia in December of the same year. In October 1897, he was promoted to colonel and transferred as a military attaché to France. In January 1901, Uchiyama  became commander of the IJA 15th Field Artillery Regiment, and was promoted to major general in June of the same year.

During the Russo-Japanese War Uchiyama commanded the IJA 1st Field Artillery Brigade, and from February 1905 was a staff officer with the IJA 5th Army. After the end of the war, he returned to Russia once again as a military attaché. In 1907, he was promoted to lieutenant general and commandant of Yura Fortress and from 1908 was commandant of Tokyo Bay Fortress. He subsequently commanded the IJA 15th Infantry Division in 1909 and the IJA 12th Infantry Division in 1912.

From 1913, he became an Aide-de-camp to the Emperor of Japan and was promoted to general in 1915. In November 1921, Uchiyama was ennobled with the title of baron  (danshaku) under the kazoku  peerage system. He entered the reserves in 1923 and was promoted to the honorific title of Junior Second Court Rank He retired in 1929 and died in 1945.

Decorations
 1893 -  Order of the Sacred Treasure, 6th class 
 1895 -  Order of the Rising Sun, 6th class 
 1895 -  Order of the Golden Kite, 4th class 
 1896 -  Order of the Sacred Treasure, 5th class 
 1904 -  Order of the Sacred Treasure, 3rd class
 1906 -  Order of the Golden Kite, 2nd class
 1906 -  Order of the Rising Sun, 2nd class
 1914 -  Grand Cordon of the Order of the Sacred Treasure
 1915 -  Grand Cordon of the Order of the Rising Sun
 1945 -  Grand Cordon of the Order of the Rising Sun with Paulownia

Foreign decorations
 1902 -  France, Legion of Honour, Commandeur
 1908 -  Russia Order of St. Stanislaus 1st degree 
 1916 -  Order of the White Eagle

References

Notes

1859 births
1945 deaths
Japanese generals
Japanese military attachés
Kazoku
Japanese military personnel of the First Sino-Japanese War
Japanese military personnel of the Russo-Japanese War
Recipients of the Order of the Golden Kite, 2nd class
Grand Cordons of the Order of the Rising Sun
Recipients of the Order of the Sacred Treasure, 1st class
Recipients of the Order of the Rising Sun with Paulownia Flowers
Commandeurs of the Légion d'honneur
Recipients of the Order of the White Eagle (Russia)